"Burn One Down" is a song co-written and recorded by American country music singer Clint Black.  It was released in October 1992 as the second single from the album The Hard Way.  The song made its chart debut in September 1992 and peaked at number 4 on the U.S. Billboard Hot Country Singles & Tracks chart. It reached number 2 on the Canadian RPM Country Tracks chart. The song was written by Black with Hayden Nicholas and Frankie Miller.

Chart positions

Year-end charts

References

1992 songs
1992 singles
Clint Black songs
Songs written by Clint Black
Songs written by Frankie Miller (country musician)
Songs written by Hayden Nicholas
Song recordings produced by James Stroud
RCA Records Nashville singles